Léa Fontaine (born 7 December 2000) is a French judoka. She won the silver medal in the +78 kg event at the 2021 European Judo Championships held in Lisbon, Portugal.

She won a medal at the 2021 World Judo Championships.

On 12 November 2022 she won a gold medal at the 2022 European Mixed Team Judo Championships as part of team France.

References

External links
 
 
 

2000 births
Living people
French female judoka
21st-century French women